The Ministry of Economic Development or Mindesa, was a national executive ministry of the Government of Colombia concerned with promoting and fomenting economic growth and development, and of regulating housing, and public services.

References

 
Ministries established in 1968
Government agencies disestablished in 2002
Defunct government agencies of Colombia
1968 establishments in Colombia
2002 disestablishments in Colombia